The New Democrats (LND) is a centre-left social liberal French political party that holds pro-European views founded 16 December 2020 by parliamentarians elected in 2017 under the label of La République en Marche!. It is co-chaired by MPs Aurélien Taché and Émilie Cariou.

They have 1 MPs sit in the National Assembly as NUPES in the Ecologist Pole.

Members 

 Aurélien Taché
 Émilie Cariou
 Guillaume Chiche
 Delphine Bagarry
 Sandrine Josso
 Fiona Lazaar

Foundation

Ecology Democracy Solidarity parliamentary group
The idea of a dissident group of deputies from La République En Marche! was floated several times in the first few years of the 15th legislature, but a group didn't materialise.
At the beginning of April 2020, in the context of the Covid-19 pandemic, the launch by 58 deputies, a senator and an MEP of a collaborative platform to develop a post-crisis plan, called The day after (French: Le jour d'après)
was reported as the prelude to a split in the presidential majority in the Assembly from a new parliamentary group from its left wing and environmentalist, coordinated by the deputies Aurélien Taché, Paula Forteza and Matthieu Orphelin.

On 8 May 2020 Les Échos revealed a split project called Ecology Democracy Solidarity. Several deputies were dissuaded from joining the group by pressure from LREM. The Ecology Democracy Solidarity group was officially tabled on 19 May 2020 by seventeen parliamentarians. Among them, seven came directly from the majority group, nine had previously left or were excluded, and only one, Delphine Batho, was not a member.

Formation of New Democrats
In June 2020, the foundation of a #NousDemain "us tomorrow" party was announced by seven members of the Ecology Democracy Solidarity group (Delphine Bagarry, Émilie Cariou, Guillaume Chiche, Paula Forteza, Albane Gaillot, Hubert Julien-Laferrière and Aurélien Taché) and about twenty other personalities (including Sandrine Josso, a Member of Parliament who is not a member of the group), with an  official launch scheduled for Autumn. This meant the EDS group no longer had a sufficient number of deputies in the assembly, so it was no longer listed in the assembly and its remaining members listed as independents (french, non-inscrits).

Ecological Pole 
LND was part of the Ecologist Pole and NUPES for the 2022 French legislative election. Delphine Bagarry, the party's only Member of Parliament lost her seat to Christian Girard from the National Rally.

See also 
 Ecology Democracy Solidarity
 La République En Marche!

References

New Democrats
New Democrats
New Democrats
New Democrats